Zauberberg may refer to:

 Der Zauberberg (known in English as The Magic Mountain), a novel by Thomas Mann
 Zauberberg (album), by Gas
 Zauberberg (ski area), Austria